Horton Run is a  long tributary to South Branch French Creek in Erie County, Pennsylvania and is classed as a 1st order stream on the EPA waters geoviewer site.

Variant names
According to the Geographic Names Information System, it has also been known historically as:  
Shreves Run

Course
Horton Run rises in southern Union Township of Erie County, Pennsylvania and then flows northwest to join South Branch French Creek.

Watershed
Horton Run drains  of Erie Drift Plain (glacial geology).  The watershed receives an average of 46.3 in/year of precipitation and has a wetness index of 468.45.

References

Rivers of Pennsylvania
Rivers of Erie County, Pennsylvania